{{Infobox organization
|name = Syrian National Council المجلس الوطني السوري|image = Syrian National Council logo.png
|abbreviation = SNC
|formation = 23 August 2011 ( years ago)
|purpose = Opposition to the Syrian Government
|headquarters = Istanbul
|location = Turkey
|region_served = Syria
|membership = 420 members (Since 1 November 2012)
|leader_title = Chairman/President
|leader_name = George Sabra
|leader_title2 = Executive Board
|leader_name2 = George SabraAbdulbaset SiedaMohamad Faruq TayfurAhmad RamadanHisham MarwahSalem al-MusallatHussein al-SaidAbdulahad AstephoJamal al-WaredNazir al-HakimKhaled al-Saleh
|leader_title3 = Spokesperson
|leader_name3 = Radwan Ziadeh
|parent_organization =
|website = 
}}

Initially, the council denied seeking to play the role of a government in exile, but this changed a few months later when violence in Syria intensified. The Syrian National Council seeks the end of Bashar al-Assad's rule and the establishment of a modern, civil, democratic state. The SNC National Charter lists human rights, judicial independence, press freedom, democracy and political pluralism as its guiding principles.

In November 2012, the Syrian National Council agreed to unify with several other opposition groups to form the National Coalition for Syrian Revolutionary and Opposition Forces, commonly named the Syrian National Coalition.

The Syrian National Council withdrew from the Syrian National Coalition on 20 January 2014 in protest at the decision of the coalition to attend the Geneva II Conference on Syria.

History
When the Arab Spring broke out, Syrian protesters began consolidating numerous opposition councils. The SNC's formation was announced in the city of Istanbul, Turkey on 23 August 2011, after a succession of meetings in Turkey and elsewhere. Its intended purpose is to "represent the concerns and demands of the Syrian people."  The creation of the SNC was celebrated by the Syrian protestors since the Friday protest following its establishment was dubbed "The Syrian National Council Represents Me".Amal Hanano  (18 April 2012) "Any given Friday" , Foreign Policy. Yaser Tabbara, the council's spokesman at that time, said the membership of the council would include 115 to 120 members from all Syrian opposition groups, including the now defunct National Council of Syria. It has so far unveiled the names of 71 members, mostly living outside Syria. On 2 October 2011, the council formally declared its organisational affiliations and structure, to include a general assembly, a general secretariat and an executive board.

 Joining the Syrian National Coalition 
In November 2012, the Syrian National Council agreed to unify with several other opposition groups to form the National Coalition for Syrian Revolutionary and Opposition Forces, commonly named the Syrian National Coalition, with the SNC having 22 out of 60 seats.

 Withdrawal from the Syrian National Coalition 
On 20 January 2014, the Syrian National Council announced that it was leaving the Syrian National Coalition in protest at the decision of the coalition to attend the Geneva II Conference on Syria. The Syrian National Council stated that participating in the talks would go backwards on its stance "to not enter negotiations" until president al-Assad left office.

 Membership 

The SNC's membership includes many members of the exiled Syrian wing of the Muslim Brotherhood and is supported by the Damascus Declaration's exile wing. The SNC itself claims to represent approximately 60 percent of the Syrian opposition. The only Kurdish party from inside Syria to have declared itself an affiliate of the SNC is the Kurdish Future Movement under the leadership of Mashaal Tammo, who was assassinated shortly after the announcement in the northeastern city of Qamishli. Adib Shishakly is a founding member.

Paris-based Syrian academic Burhan Ghalioun has served as its most prominent spokesperson and was named in September 2011 as chair of the council. Former Muslim Brotherhood leader Ali Sadr el-Din Bayanouni stated that Ghalioun was chosen because he "is accepted in the West and at home and, to prevent the regime from capitalising on the presence of an Islamist at the top of the SNC."

On 10 June 2012, a new leader for Syrian National council was elected. Swedish based Abdulbaset Sida, a Kurd, will take over for three months after Burhan Ghalioun was forced away.

Plagued with internal conflict, the SNC on 13 March 2012 saw three prominent members resigning, giving as their reason that the SNC "had not gotten very far in working to arm the rebels,". The three were Haitham al-Maleh, a former judge and long-standing dissident, Islamist-leaning liberal and opposition leader Kamal al-Labwani and human rights lawyer Catherine al-Talli. Their reasons for resigning were that the SNC is corrupt, a liberal front for the Muslim Brotherhood and had not made significant progress in arming the rebels. One secular member of the SNC claimed that more than half of the council are Islamists.

On 27 March 2012, the recently resigned members, including Maleh and Labwani, agreed to rejoin the SNC, under the condition that SNC would agree to be more democratic and expand, although Labwani expressed doubts whether the opposition would be able to hold together, but said that for now their accord will help Arab and Western governments make Assad stop his brutal repression. Abdual al-Haj of the SNC said that "now the international community no longer has an excuse to withhold support for the revolution, help arm the Free Syrian Army and establish safe zones to protect the civilian Syrian population." This happened at a meeting in Istanbul called by Turkey and Qatar. Despite the National Coordination Committee not attending and the Kurdish delegation as well as an unnamed senior dissident walking out, the BBC reported from the meeting that "[a]ll but one of Syria's disparate opposition groups have agreed to unite behind the Syrian National Council."

The SNC, despite having had a Kurdish chairman, does not have Kurdish nationalist members. Abdulhakim Bashar, Secretary-General of the Kurdish Democratic Party of Syria, claims the SNC is too "much influenced by Turkey" and demanded guarantees for the Kurds in Syria by the SNC and says that Turkey would, in turn, be obliged to grant full rights to Turkey's Kurds.

Political positions
On 28 October 2011, the SNC expressed worries about the Libyan scenario (with the violent overthrow of Muammar Gaddafi) being reiterated in Syria. It warned against a militarization of the conflict and insisted that the revolution was not sectarian but included all factions of the Syrian society. It also put its hopes in the multiplications of acts of civil disobedience as they "can be generalized, developed and expanded. This is because they are peaceful. These will be supported by businesses and others who are afraid of the costs of war. Peaceful methods are generalizable."

However, the SNC came to review its position on the peaceful nature of the uprising. According to the SNC, the opposition is now faced with two options: "greater militarization of local resistance or foreign intervention." With China and Russia veto impeding a Security Council resolution, the international intervention scenario is unlikely to unfold. As a result, in the context of increasing defections in the military and the escalating violence in Syria, the SNC and the Free Syrian Army struck a deal in January 2012, recognising the units of anti-government rebels fighting in Syria. The SNC said that it was the duty of the opposition "to assist the rebels." While the SNC asserted that it would not provide arms directly to the Free Syrian Army, it will provide funds to "keep the Free Syrian Army afloat." For this reason, donations can be made on the SNC website.

Analysis from war observers
Marc Lynch, a Professor of Political Science in the United States, is cited from his April 2016 book The New Arab Wars: Uprising and Anarchy in the Middle East'' as describing the Syrian National Council as a conduit by which the hopelessly factionalised Syrian opposition attracted and distributed money and arms from foreign sponsors.

Support and recognition

Prior to joining the National Coalition for Syrian Revolutionary and Opposition Forces, the Syrian National Council had been recognised as the legitimate representative of the Syrian people by several UN member states.

On 6 March 2013, the Syrian National Coalition was granted Syria's seat in the Arab League.

Syrian Patriotic Group
On 27 February 2012, Haitham al-Maleh and Kamal al-Labwani along with 18 other members of the SNC formed a sub-group called the Syrian Patriotic Group. The leading activists of the SNC consider many of the SNC members to be too slow in taking action, and so the group is designed so that while still remaining SNC members, the 20 leading activists would speed up "backing the national effort to bring down the regime with all available resistance means including supporting the Free Syrian Army".

See also
National Council for the Forces of the Peaceful Revolution (Yemen)
National Transitional Council (Libya)

References

External links
Official website

 
Governments in exile